= Brookfield, Virginia =

Unincorporated community in Virginia, US

Coordinates: 38°18′40″N 77°25′58″W

Brookfield is an unincorporated community in Stafford County, in the U.S. state of Virginia.
